Roger Andrew Caras (May 24, 1928 – February 18, 2001) was an American wildlife photographer, writer, wildlife preservationist and television personality.

Known as the host of the annual Westminster Kennel Club Dog Show, Caras was the author of more than 70 books, a veteran of network television programs including Nightline, ABC World News Tonight and 20/20 before devoting himself to work as president of the American Society for the Prevention of Cruelty to Animals. "Animals are not our whole life, but they make our lives whole" -Roger Caras

Biography

Early life and education 

Born May 24, 1928, in the rural town of Methuen, Massachusetts, Caras was raised in a family that encouraged love of animals. His parents allowed him to foster a menagerie of pets, and during the Depression he went to work at the age of 10 to help pay for his pets' upkeep. His first job, working in the stables of an SPCA shelter, was his first experience with animal rescue in the shelter's haven for abused horses. He completed his education at Boston's Huntington Preparatory School and immediately enlisted in the U.S. Army near the end of World War II.

Caras returned to Boston after his tour of duty and then enrolled as a zoology major at Northwestern University. In 1950, he transferred to Case Western Reserve University, Cleveland, Ohio, but interrupted his education for military service again, this time in the Korean War from 1950 to 1952.

Career 

Caras returned to civilian life as a West Coast resident, attending the University of Southern California, where he earned a degree, not in zoology but in cinema, and stepped from academic life to executive-level work in the motion picture industry. During 15 years in the film world, Caras held a number of assignments, including serving as press secretary for actress Joan Crawford, and from 1965 to 1969 as vice president of Stanley Kubrick's production company, Hawk Films, working with Kubrick and Arthur C. Clarke on the science fiction epic 2001: A Space Odyssey. During his Hollywood years, Caras also launched his writing career, contributing articles on animal and environmental issues to such periodicals as "Audubon" and publishing his first book, "Antarctica: Land of Frozen Time,” in 1962.

In 1964, Caras made his broadcasting debut on the NBC News program The Today Show, spending nearly a decade as the program's "house naturalist." His skills in broadcasting, research, biology, and zoology led to his acceptance as one of the media's best-regarded animal authorities. He was sought out by the Walt Disney conglomerate as a consultant on their Florida Animal Kingdom park.

Acting as a special correspondent, Caras reported from around the globe on a variety of animal and environmental issues that ranged from exposes on laboratory animals to the plight of the endangered Giant Panda in China and to investigation of the black market commerce in exotic animals and poaching.

Caras spent from 1975 to 1992 as a regularly featured reporter on ABC Evening News (later World News Tonight with Peter Jennings,) as well as contributing to Nightline, 20/20, and Good Morning America. He also hosted radio programs, including Pets and Wildlife on CBS, Report from the World of Animals on NBC, and the ABC series The Living World.

Caras won an Emmy Award for his reporting. His books include The Bond and his last book, Going for the Blue: Inside the World of Show Dogs and Dog Shows, which was published in time for the 2001 Westminster competition.

Caras’s work with and on behalf of animals led to his 1991 election as the 14th president of the American Society for the Prevention of Cruelty to Animals, the oldest humane-treatment-of-animals organization in the United States. During his tenure, the ASPCA expanded its care, protection and education programs, and adopted a number of internal practices to improve its work. Caras retired in 1999 and became president emeritus, acting as a consultant and public speaker for the organization.

Death and afterward 

Caras made his home in Freeland, Baltimore County, Maryland, where he and his wife, Jill Langdon Barclay, maintained a farm that became home for a variety of animals. In 2001, in the last year of his life, Caras shared his farm with 12 dogs (7 Greyhounds, 3 retrievers and 2 hounds), nine cats, all of mixed origin, five horses, two cows, a pair of alpacas and a llama. After his death, his wife, his son, Dr. Barclay Caras, and daughter, Pamela Caras, requested that people wishing to honor his memory donate memorial contributions to the ASPCA in his name.

Selected works

Books 

 Antarctica; land of frozen time. With special charts by A. Peter Ianuzzi.  1962 
 Dangerous to man; wild animals: a definitive study of their reputed dangers to man, by Roger A. Caras.  1964    
 Wings of gold: the story of United States naval aviation, by Roger A. Caras.  1965    
 Last Chance on Earth: A Requiem for Wildlife, by Roger A. Caras. Illustrated by Charles Fracé.  1966    
 Custer Wolf; biography of an American renegade, by Roger A. Caras. Illustrated by Charles Fracé.  1966    
 Loup blanc de Custer, roman [par] Roger Caras. [Traduit de l'américain par Yves Braínville.] 1967    
 North American Mammals: Fur-Bearing Animals of the United States and Canada, by Roger A. Caras.  1967   
 Sarang: the story of a Bengal tiger and of two children in search of a miracle, a novel, by Roger A. Caras.  1968    
 Monarch of Deadman Bay; the life and death of a Kodiak bear, by Roger A. Caras.  1969    
 Animal children, edited by Roger Caras. Foreword by Roger Tory Peterson.  1970
 Panther! Illus. by Charles Fracé.  1970
 Source of the thunder; the biography of a California condor. Illus. by Charles Fracé. Foreword by Roland C. Clement.  1970
 Vanishing wildlife, edited by Roger Caras. Foreword by Roger Tory Peterson.  1970    
 Animal architecture. Edited by Roger Caras. Foreword by Roger Tory Peterson.  1971     
 Birds in flight. Edited by Roger Caras. Foreword by Roger Tory Peterson.  1971      
 Death as a way of life [by] Roger A. Caras.  1971     
 Animal courtships. Edited by Roger Caras. Foreword by Roger Tory Peterson.  1972     
 Boundary: land and sea. Edited by Roger Caras. Foreword by Roger Tory Peterson.  1972    
 Creatures of the night. Edited by Roger Caras. Foreword by Roger Tory Peterson.  1972    
 Last chance on earth; a requiem for wildlife, by Roger A. Caras. Illustrated by Charles Fracé. New pref. by the author.  1972    
 Protective coloration and mimicry; nature's camouflage. Edited by Roger Caras. Foreword by Roger Tory Peterson.  1972    
 Going to the zoo with Roger Caras, by Roger Caras. Illustrated by Cyrille R. Gentry. Foreword by William G. Conway.  1973    
 Wonderful world of mammals; adventuring with stamps, by Roger Caras.  1973    
 Bizarre animals / by Roger Caras; foreword by Roger Tory Peterson.  1974    
 North American mammals: fur-bearing animals of the United States and Canada / by Roger A. Caras.  1974    
 Private lives of animals. Commentary by Roger Caras. Design and coordination by Massimo Vignelli and Gudrun Buettner. Assembled and edited by Milton Rugoff and Ann Guilfoyle.  1974    
 Venomous animals / by Roger Caras; foreword by Roger Tory Peterson.  1974    
 Venomous animals of the world [by] Roger Caras.  1974    
 Dangerous to man: the definitive story of wildlife's reputed dangers / Roger A. Caras.  1975    
 Sockeye: the life of a Pacific salmon / by Roger Caras.  1975    
 Zoo in your room / Roger Caras; ill. by Pamela Johnson.  1975    
 Roger Caras pet book / Roger A. Caras.  1976    
 Skunk for a day / Roger Caras; pictures by Diane Paterson.  1976     
 Pet medicine: health care and first aid for all household pets / by Roger Caras ... [et al.]; with ill. by Suzanne Clee; designed by Barbara Bell Pitnof.  1977    
 Coyote for a day / Roger Caras; illustrated by Diane Paterson.  1977    
 Monarch of Deadman Bay: the life and death of a Kodiak bear / by Roger Caras; ill. by Charles Fracé.  1977    
 Panther! / by Roger Caras; ill. by Charles Fracé.  1977    
 Source of the thunder: the biography of a California condor / by Roger Caras; ill. by Charles Fracé; foreword by Roland C. Clement.  1977    
 Dog owner's Bible / editor, Roger A. Caras; special assistant editor, Donald L. Wall ... [et al.].  1978    
 Custer Wolf: biography of an American renegade / by Roger A. Caras; introd. by Gerald Durrell; illustrated by Charles Fracé.  1979    
 Dogs: records, stars, feats, and facts / Roger Caras and Pamela C. Graham.  1979    
 Forest / Roger Caras; ill. by Norman Arlott.  1979    
 Mysteries of nature, explained and unexplained / by Roger Caras.  1979    
 Yankee: the inside story of a champion bloodhound / Roger A. Caras.  1979    
 Amiable little beasts: investigating the lives of young animals / conceived and edited by Ann Guilfoyle; text by Roger A. Caras and Steve Graham.  1980    
 Forest / Roger Caras; ill. by Norman Arlott.  1980    
 Roger Caras dog book / photos. by Alton Anderson.  1980    
 Celebration of dogs / Roger Caras.  1982    
 Celebration of dogs / Roger Caras.  1984    
 Harper's illustrated handbook of cats / health care section by Robert W. Kirk; edited by Roger Caras; with photographs by Richard J. Katris and Nancy Katris.  1985    
 Harper's illustrated handbook of dogs / health care section by Robert W. Kirk; edited by Roger Caras; with photographs by John L. Ashby.  1985    
 Endless migrations / Roger Caras; illustrations by Kimio Honda.  1985    
 Mara Simba: the African lion / Roger Caras.  1985    
 Celebration of cats / Roger A. Caras.  1986    
 Roger Caras' treasury of great cat stories.  1987    
 Roger Caras' treasury of great dog stories.  1987    
 Animals in their places: tales from the natural world / Roger A. Caras.  1987    
 Private lives of animals / commentary by Roger Caras.  1987    
 Cat is watching: a look at the way cats see us / Roger A. Caras.  1989    
 Animal families of the wild: animal stories / by Roger Caras ... [et al.]; edited by William F. Russell; with art by John Butler.  1990    
 Roger Caras' treasury of great horse stories.  1990    
 Custer wolf: biography of an American renegade / by Roger A. Caras; illustrated by Charles Fracé.  1990    
 Monarch of Deadman Bay: the life and death of a Kodiak bear / by Roger A. Caras; illustrations by Charles Fracé.  1990    
 Panther! / by Roger A. Caras; illustrations by Charles Fracé.  1990    
 Forest / Roger Caras; illustrations by Norman Arlott.  1991    
 Sarang: the story of a Bengal tiger and of two children in search of a miracle: a novel / by Roger A. Caras.  1991      
 Source of the thunder: the biography of a California condor / by Roger A. Caras; illustrations by Charles Fracé; foreword by Roland C. Clement.  1991    
 Cats at work / Rhonda Gray and Stephen T. Robinson; commentary by Roger Caras; commissioned photography by Guy Powers.  1991     
 Custer wolf [sound recording] / by Roger A. Caras.  1992    
 Dog is listening: the way some of our closest friends view us / Roger A. Caras.  1992    
 Roger Caras dog book / Roger Caras; photographs by Alton Anderson.  1992    
 Roger Caras' treasury of classic nature tales.  1992    
 Cats of Thistle Hill: a mostly peaceable kingdom / Roger A. Caras; photographs by Dave and Jennifer McMichael, additional photographs by Mimi Vang Olsen; back cover portrait of Roger Caras by Ian Hornak.  1994     
 World full of animals: the Roger Caras story / by Roger Caras.  1994    
 Field guide to venomous animals and poisonous plants, North America, north of Mexico / Steven Foster and Roger A. Caras.  1994     
 Most dangerous journey: the life of an African elephant / Roger A. Caras, with photographs by the author.  1995     
 Perfect harmony: the intertwining lives of animals and humans throughout history / Roger A. Caras.  1996    *Roger Caras dog book / Roger Caras; principal photography by Alton Anderson.  1996    
 New Roger Caras treasury of great cat stories.  1997    
 Bond: people and their animals / essays by Roger Caras; photographs by Shel Secunda.  1997    
 Cat is watching: a look at the way cats see us / Roger A. Cars.  1997    
 Dog is listening: the way some of our closest friends view us / Roger A. Caras.  1998    
 New Roger Caras treasury of great dog stories.  1999    
 New Roger Caras treasury of great horse stories.  1999    
 Roger Caras' treasury of great fishing stories.  1999    
 Going for the blue: inside the world of show dogs and dog shows / by Roger A. Caras.  2001

See also 
 Dogs in the United States

Notes

References 
 "Roger Caras, 72, Animal Welfare Advocate," New York Times, Sherri Day, Feb 20, 2001.
 Library of Congress

External links

1928 births
2001 deaths
American naturalists
American nature writers
American male non-fiction writers
20th-century American photographers
American television personalities
Animal welfare workers
Nature photographers
20th-century naturalists